Zhu Zhigeng (朱志堩, 1404–1424) was a Chinese prince of the Ming dynasty. He was the second son of Zhu Shangbing, Prince Yin of Qin and Lady Liu, Princess Yin of Qin, and he was made Prince of Qin (秦王) in 1412.

He died without a son in 1424 and was given the posthumous name of Xi (僖). His title was inherited by his elder half-brother, Zhu Zhijun, Prince Huai of Qin.

References 

1404 births
1424 deaths
Ming dynasty imperial princes